Lasiopetalum membranaceum is a species of flowering plant in the family Malvaceae and is endemic to near-coastal areas of south-western Western Australia. It is an erect, spreading shrub or subshrub with hairy young stems, egg-shaped leaves and mauve-pink and dark red flowers.

Description
Flowering occurs from September to December.

Taxonomy
This taxon was first formally described in 1845 by Ernst Gottlieb von Steudel who gave it the name Corethrostylis membranacea in Johann Georg Christian Lehmann's Plantae Preissianae. In 1863, George Bentham changed the name to Lasiopetalum membranaceum in Flora Australiensis. The specific epithet (membranaceum) means "membranous", referring to the leaves.

Distribution and habitat
This lasiopetalum grows in forest or woodland in near-coastal areas and occurs from Perth (including in Kings Park) to near Augusta in the Jarrah Forest, Swan Coastal Plain and Warren biogeographic area of southern Western Australia.

Conservation status
Lasiopetalum membranaceum is listed as "Priority Three" by the Government of Western Australia Department of Biodiversity, Conservation and Attractions, meaning that it is poorly known and known from only a few locations but is not under imminent threat.

References

membranaceum
Malvales of Australia
Rosids of Western Australia
Taxa named by Ernst Gottlieb von Steudel
Plants described in 1845